The Moors River is a river in east Dorset, England, which starts at the point where the River Crane and the Ebblake Stream meet, at Ebblake, south of Verwood.

It runs south then southeast, past Bournemouth International Airport and Hurn to join the River Stour at Blackwater, Dorset.

It is well known to dragonfly enthusiasts as the last site in Britain where Orange-spotted Emerald occurred.

References

Rivers of Dorset
1Moors